Paite is a Sino-Tibetan Language spoken by a subgroup of the Chin Kuki people. There are different Paite dialects. The language exhibits mutual intelligibility with the other languages of the region including Hmar, Vaiphei, Simte, Kom, Gangte and other languages. The name Paite could translate to 'the people who went', 'a group of people marching'.

Sample text
The following is a sample text in Paite of Article 1 of the Universal Declaration of Human Rights:

There are two major dialects of Paite spoken in Manipur: Lamjang and Dapjal; and 4 minor dialects which are Songtal, Bukpi, Lousau & Kangkap.

Education and Academic 
Paite language can now be taken up as one of the MIL subjects offered in the Three-Year Degree course in Manipur University. The Academic Council of the university in its meeting held on April 22, 2004 gave its approval for the inclusion of Paite as one of the MIL subjects after considering recommendation by the Board of Studies of the School of Humanities, and also in recognition of the richness of the language and its literature including creative writing.

References

Further reading

Muivah, Esther T. 1993. English-Paite dictionary. Lamka, Manipur: Paite Tribe Council.
Tualkhothang, Naulak. 2003. English-Paite dictionary. Lamka, Manipur: The Tualkhothang Naulak Memorial Trust.
Tawmbing, Chinzam. 2014. English-Paite dictionary. Lamka, Manipur: Hornbill Publication.
Paite Tribe Council. 2013. Paite customary law & practices / Paite pupa ngeina dan leh a kizatnate. Lamka, Manipur: Paite Tribe Council.
Thuamkhopau, T. 2009. Paite paunaak leh pau upate. Manipur: Tribal Research Institute.
https://www.paite.org

Kuki-Chin languages
Languages of Assam
Languages of Manipur
Languages of Mizoram
Languages of Tripura
Endangered languages of India